Condoriquiña (possibly from Aymara kunturi condor, ikiña to sleep, bed or blanket) is a  mountain in the Andes of Peru, situated in the Vilcanota mountain range south east of Cusco. It is located in the Cusco Region, Canchis Province, Pitumarca District, and in the Quispicanchi Province, Marcapata District. It lies east of Lake Sibinacocha.

See also
 List of mountains in Peru
 List of mountains in the Andes

References

Mountains of Cusco Region
Mountains of Peru
Glaciers of Peru